Events from the year 1520 in Ireland.

Incumbent
Lord: Henry VIII

Events
James Fitzgerald became the 10th Earl of Desmond.

Births

Deaths
 Ulick Óge Burke, 8th lord of Clanricarde

References

 
1520s in Ireland
Ireland
Years of the 16th century in Ireland